Profile 21 is a medical profile code used by the military of Israel to classify Israelis who are deemed to have physical or psychological disabilities, making them permanently unfit for military service.

Additionally, Profile 24 is a code used to classify those who are deemed temporarily unfit for military service. Those with this classification will generally be reclassified within a year as either fit for military service or as Profile 21.

Individuals with Profile 21 can still apply to volunteer for service in the IDF. The application process takes several months, and acceptance is not guaranteed. Once accepted however, the individuals would be upgraded to Profile 30, and are expected to serve at least 24 months, usually in rear-echelon positions close to home, and exempt from full basic training and rotational duties. Volunteering with Profile 21 is possible up to the age of 28 for men and 22 for women.

In recent years some Israelis have begun to use Profile 21 as a means of avoiding conscription, which is universal in Israel. This usually takes the form of deliberately failing medical exams so as to appear unfit for military service. Most often, recruits or soldiers pretend to be mentally ill, due to very few individuals receiving Profile 21 on a non-psychological basis.

Soldiers who have already been recruited by the IDF may see a psychologist, called Ktzin Bri'ut Ha'Nefesh (kaban, lit. "Mental Health Officer"), who is authorized to refer the soldier to a psychiatrist. The psychiatrist is then able to recommend Profile 21.

There are a number of problems in civilian life for soldiers who are deemed unfit for military service with Profile 21. Previously, most employers, especially when hiring employees without experience, looked to the employee's service records to evaluate their work ethic and potential. In 1994 such behavior was made illegal (although some private companies still do so), however, a soldier exempt from the army on Profile 21 receives an exemption certificate instead of a discharge certificate, allowing employers to find out whether they have been classified as such. Persons with Profile 21 with mental illness as the reason may not acquire a driver's license for a public vehicle in Israel (e.g. an ambulance). Many governmental and/or civilian jobs (mainly security guards and personnel) cannot be attained by those with Profile 21.

See also
 Section 8 (military) — U.S. Army
 Medical Profile

References

External links
BBC article on the draft in Israel

Conscription in Israel
Health in Israel
Israel Defense Forces
Society of Israel
Military psychiatry